Rap for Youth (说唱新世代) is a Chinese rap streaming competition television series that airs on the digital and streaming service Bilibili.  The show features regular judges Huang Zitao, MC HotDog, Higher Brothers and Indonesian rapper Rich Brian, and special guest judge Li Yuchun.  The show, which began airing in the summer of 2020, puts it in direct competition with other major Chinese rap competition shows such as The Rap of China, which airs on iQIYI, and Rap Star, which airs on Mango TV.

Rap for Youth was acclaimed by critics and audiences, and received a 9.2 out of 10 rating on Douban, which is among the highest ever ratings for any music programs on Douban.

The first season of Rap for Youth began airing on August 22, 2020, and concluded on November 1, 2020.   It has accumulated 550 million streaming views on Bilibili.

See also
 The Rap of China, rap competition show on iQIYI
 Rap Star, rap competition show on Mango TV

References

External links
 Rap for Youth on Bilibili (in Chinese)
 

2020 Chinese television series debuts
Chinese reality television series
Chinese music television series
Chinese-language television shows